`

Top Rankers is a 2015 Telugu-language philosophical film, produced by Pasupuleti Brahmam under the Viswa Vision Films banner and directed by Gollapati Nageswara Rao. It stars Rajendra Prasad and Sony Charishta in the lead roles, with music composed by Jaya Surya. The film was released on 30 January 2015.

Plot
The film is based on the present education system which deals with the agony of the students. St. Mary's educational institute's Principal, Prof. Viswanath (Rajendra Prasad) a monarch. introduces hardcore rules and regulations instead of humanizing the students and addresses them as robotics that ranks in EAMCET. Regardless of their happiness or considering them as human, including his daughter. Here, he shows hatred towards his daughter as she falls short of his intentions, which leads to her suicide. Thereupon, Viswanath realizes his mistake and decides to reform the education system. So, he develops a friendly atmosphere in the institute and sculpts the students as masters in all fields. Soon after, various institutes bribe their parents to counterfeit the credit as self. However, at last, the students publicly dedicate the success to their mentor showing gratitude.

Cast
Rajendra Prasad as Prof. Viswanath
Sony Charishta as Lecturer Kalyani
Giri Babu
Sivaji Raja
Ashok Kumar

Soundtrack 

The music and lyrics were composed and written by Jayasurya. The music was released by ADITYA Music Company.

References

2010s Telugu-language films